Serhat Arvas is a Turkish action movie film director and head of a martial arts stunt team.

He was born in İstanbul on June 2, 1983. He completed his primary and high school education in Fatih (one of the central districts of İstanbul). He was attracted by the eastern martial arts at the age of 8 just after the movies he had watched. In the beginning  his training was not going beyond trying freestyle with his friends but when he was 10 he decided to improve himself on a discipline.

He’d improved himself in 7 different martial art disciplines including Full-Contact, Kung-Fu, Whu-Shu and Aiki-do. With the ability and passion to martial arts he started educating senior classes at a very young age.

In 2001 he founded “Yıldırım Stunt Team”. The team made a short film named Eagles Claw.

Furthermore, to accomplish his dream of making Turkish action films by combining cinema with eastern martial arts, Arvas took acting and diction lessons at Müjdat Gezen Acting School in 2002, then continued his education at İstanbul Metropolitan Municipality Performance Arts Center.

In 2003 Yıldırım Stunt Team was disbanded. Arvas took on a side role in the well-known Turkish serial called Kurtlar Vadisi in 2004.

As intending to give fight scenes a more professional look in his movies, he formed “Serhat Arvas Stunt Team” in late 2004. He also continued his studies on arranging fight scenes, fight choreographies, stunting, camera angles and action in cinema. Team’s first short feature project called Fists of Vengeance highly drew public attention. Lately, they are having the proud of  their feature film named Fearless Tiger whose screenplay belongs to Arvas and also directed by himself.

Filmography
2002 - short film (Action) : "Eagles Claw" - actor and director

2003 - short film (Action) : "One day in İstanbul" - actor

2004 - short film (Action) : "Fists of Vengeance" - actor and director

2004 - TV-series (in Turkey): "Valley of the Wolves" (Kurtlar vadisi) - accessory actor

2005 - long film  (Action) : "Fearless Tiger" (Korkusuz kaplan) - actor, director, martial arts and action choreographer

2006 - short film (Horror) : "Nightmare in Blood" - actor and director

2006 - short film (Horror) : "Neurotic" - director

2006 - short film (Horror) : "Nemesis"  - director

2007 - TV series ( Advertorial) : "Akbank-axess cart" - actor

2008 - "Mr.KILINK" - actor

2008 - "DELI DUMRUL" - actor

2008 - "TARGET:5" - actor and director

External links
Serhat Arvas web sites:
http://www.serhatarvas.com  THE OFFICIAL WEB SITE

1983 births
Living people
Turkish martial artists
Turkish film directors
Film people from Istanbul
Turkish stunt performers